Jan Łopuszański may refer to:
 Jan Łopuszański (physicist) (1923-2008), professor of Wrocław University
 Jan Łopuszański (politician), (1955-) leader of the political party Polish Agreement